Boneyabad (also Romanized as Boneyābād, Beneyābād, Bonīābād, Bonyābād, and Buniabad; also known as Bohnābād and Buhnābād) is a village in Keybar Rural District, Jolgeh Zozan District, Khaf County, Razavi Khorasan Province, Iran. At the 2006 census, its population was 685, in 152 families.

References 

Populated places in Khaf County